The 1970 All-Ireland Under-21 Football Championship was the seventh staging of the All-Ireland Under-21 Football Championship since its establishment by the Gaelic Athletic Association in 1964.

Antrim entered the championship as defending champions, however, they were defeated by Derry in the Ulster quarter-final.

On 4 October 1970, Cork won the championship following a 2-11 to 0-9 defeat of Fermanagh in the All-Ireland final. This was their first All-Ireland title.

Connacht Under-21 Football Championship

Connacht final

Leinster Under-21 Football Championship

Leinster final

Munster Under-21 Football Championship

Munster quarter-finals

Munster semi-finals

Munster final

Ulster Under-21 Football Championship

Ulster final

All-Ireland Under-21 Football Championship

All-Ireland semi-finals

All-Ireland final

Statistics

Miscellaneous

 In the provincial championships there were a number of firsts as Fermanagh and Louth won the respective Ulster and Leinster titles for the first time in their history.
 The All-Ireland semi-final between Louth and Fermanagh remains their only championship meeting.

References

1970
All-Ireland Under-21 Football Championship